= Fashrah =

- Location within United Arab Emirates
- Coordinates: 24°52′48″N 56°12′23″E
- Country: United Arab Emirates
- Emirate: Ras Al Khaimah
- Elevation: 141 m (463 ft)

Fashrah is a settlement in Ras Al Khaimah, United Arab Emirates (UAE).
